Sir John Henslow (9 October 1730 – 22 September 1815) was Surveyor to the Navy (Royal Navy) a post he held jointly or solely from 1784 to 1806.

Career

He was 7th child of John Henslow a master carpenter in the dockyard at Woolwich

 1745 Apprenticed to Sir Thomas Slade
 1762 Master Boat Builder at Woolwich
 1771 Assistant Surveyor to the Navy
 1784 Surveyor to the Navy
 1793 Knighted
 1806 retired to Sittingbourne, Kent

Cape Henslow on Guadalcanal is named after him.

From 1793 he worked jointly with William Rule.

He also designed the Bloodhound-class gun-brigs and Conquest-class gun-brigs. The  sixth rates were a series of six ships built to his 1805 design. Perhaps his smallest vessels were the two Placentia-class sloops of 42 tons burthen, which he designed for coastal patrol duties off Newfoundland.

Family

His son John Prentis Henslow, solicitor, was father of John Stevens Henslow.  He was also the grandfather of Francis Hartwell Henslowe, who was the son of Edward Prentis Henslow.

Notes and references

1730 births
People from Woolwich
1815 deaths
Surveyors of the Navy
18th-century British engineers
19th-century British engineers
18th-century Royal Navy personnel
19th-century Royal Navy personnel